The Rolls-Royce SMR, also known as the UK SMR, is a small modular reactor (SMR) being developed by the Rolls-Royce (RR) company in the United Kingdom.

The company has been given financial support by the UK Government to develop its design. It is estimated that the 470MWe units will cost around £1.8billion once in full production, compared with £22billion for a full-sized nuclear power station such as the planned 3,300MWe Sizewell C. Construction time and site size needed will also be lower.

History
RR began design work on the SMR  with a team of about 150 people, with decisions made near the start of the project to use light water as both coolant and moderator.

In 2016, it was reported that the UK Government was assessing Welsh SMR sites - including the former Trawsfynydd nuclear power station - and on the site of former nuclear or coal-fired power stations in Northern England. Existing nuclear sites including Bradwell, Hartlepool, Heysham, Oldbury, Sizewell, Sellafield and Wylfa were stated to be possibilities.

In 2017, the consortium headed by RR needed to seek UK government finance to support further development. In December 2017 The UK government provided funding of up to £56million over three years to support SMR research and development.

In 2018, the UK SMR industry sought billions of pounds of government support to finance their putative First of a Kind projects. The Expert Finance Working Group on Small Reactors produced a report stating that there was "a current market failure in supporting nuclear projects generally" and identifying options for government to support SMR development in the UK.

In 2019, the government committed a further £18million to the development from its Industrial Strategy Challenge Fund, to begin designing the modular system.
In November 2021, the UK government provided funding of £210million to further develop the design, partly matched by £195million of investment by Rolls-Royce Group, BNF Resources UK Limited and Exelon Generation Limited. At that point they expected the first unit would be completed in the early 2030s.

In 2020, it was reported that Rolls-Royce had plans to construct up to 16 SMRs in the UK.

On 1 April 2022, the regulatory Generic Design Assessment (GDA) of the Rolls-Royce SMR started.  The assessment will begin once the timescales and resources have been agreed. The assessment is likely to take about 4 and a half years.

In October 2022, Rolls-Royce announced that it was exploring eight possible sites in the UK to build the first of three expected factories for parts of the SMR. In November 2022, four sites were identified suitable for multiple SMR units: Trawsfynydd, Sellafield, near Wylfa, and near Oldbury.

In March 2023, Rolls-Royce stated that the current programme funding of £500 million will run out by the end of 2024, and requested negotiations with the UK government to find fresh investment. Hiring of new staff has been stopped. About 600 staff work on the programme in Derby, Warrington and Manchester.

Design

RR is preparing a small modular reactor (SMR) design called the UK SMR, a close-coupled three-loop pressurized water reactor (PWR) design. Power output was initially designed to be 440MWe, and subsequently increased to 470MWe which is above the usual range considered to be a SMR.  It should be able to power a city the size of Sheffield.

The intended fuel is uranium dioxide. A modular forced draft cooling tower will be used. The design targets a 500 day construction time, on a  site. Overall build time is expected to be four years, two years for site preparation and two years for construction and commissioning.

The target cost for a 470MWe Rolls-Royce SMR unit is £1.8billion for the fifth unit built, or around £3.8million per MWe. As a comparison the estimated cost for the full-size 3.3GWe Sizewell C nuclear power station is £22billion, or around £6.7million per MWe.

See also
 List of small modular reactor designs
 Nuclear power in the United Kingdom
 U-Battery, a micro-SMR development also supported by the UK Government

References

Notes

Footnotes

Sources
 
 
 
 
 
 
 
 
 
 
 
 
 
 
 
 
 
 
 

Rolls-Royce
Small modular reactor